Carlos Alberto Vázquez Fernández (born 25 April 1999), commonly known as Cavafe, is a Cuban professional footballer who plays as a centre-back for Austrian Second League club FC Dornbirn and the Cuba national team.

Club career
Born in Havana, Cavafe moved to Madrid in 2003 at the age of three, and represented CD Valdemorillo, CD Canillas, CD San Fernando de Henares and Atlético Madrid as a youth. On 23 August 2018, after finishing his formation, he returned to San Fernando and was assigned to the main squad in Tercera División.

Cavafe made his senior debut on 26 August 2018, starting in a 1–2 away loss against Rayo Vallecano B. The following 1 February, he signed for AD Alcorcón and was initially assigned to the reserves also in the fourth tier.

Cavafe made his first team debut on 17 December 2019, starting and being sent off in a 0–1 away loss against CP Cacereño, for the season's Copa del Rey. The following 14 January, he was loaned to Segunda División B side Unionistas de Salamanca CF until the end of the campaign.

On 20 June 2022, Cavafe signed for Austrian second tier side FC Dornbirn

International career
In March 2021, Cavafe was named in Cuba senior team's historic squad which included players from foreign clubs for the first time. On 25 March 2021, he made his senior team debut in a 0–1 defeat against Guatemala.

Career statistics

International

Scores and results list Cuba's goal tally first, score column indicates score after each Cavafe goal.

References

External links
 
 

1999 births
Living people
Sportspeople from Havana
Association football defenders
Cuban footballers
Cuba international footballers
Segunda División B players
Tercera División players
2. Liga (Austria) players
CD San Fernando de Henares players
AD Alcorcón B players
Unionistas de Salamanca CF players
CDA Navalcarnero players
CD Tudelano footballers
FC Dornbirn 1913 players
Cuban expatriate footballers
Cuban expatriate sportspeople in Spain
Expatriate footballers in Spain
Expatriate footballers in Austria
Primera Federación players